The Adventures of Sir Lancelot is a British television series first broadcast in 1956, produced by Sapphire Films for ITC Entertainment and screened on the ITV network. The series starred William Russell as the eponymous Sir Lancelot, a Knight of the Round Table in the time of King Arthur at Camelot.

In the United States, it was originally broadcast on NBC from 1956 to 1957. Its success on the network led to it becoming the first British television series to have entire episodes filmed in colour, with the last fourteen of the thirty half-hour episodes being shot on colour stock, although they were seen in colour only in the US. (Although the BBC's 1954 TV series Zoo Quest pre-dated The Adventures of Sir Lancelot use of colour film stock by two years, this was only for the location work whilst the studio links were captured by monochrome video cameras).

As was common with other British television series of the time, the programme employed several American screenwriters who had moved to Britain after being placed on the Hollywood blacklist, often under pseudonyms. These included Ian McLellan Hunter, Hy Kraft and Ring Lardner Jr. The series was made at Nettlefold Studios in Walton-on-Thames.

Cast and characters
William Russell as Sir Lancelot (30 episodes)
Cyril Smith as Merlin (24 episodes)
Ronald Leigh-Hunt as King Arthur (22 episodes)
Bruce Seton as King Arthur (Episodes 1-3 only)
Robert Scroggins as Brian (Lancelot's squire) (22 episodes)
David Morrell as Sir Kay & others (21 episodes)
Jane Hylton as Queen Guinevere (14 episodes)
Derren Nesbitt (credited as Derry Nesbitt) as Sir Tristan & others (14 episodes)

Broadcast history
The series debuted in the UK on Saturday 15 September 1956, on London weekend ITV franchise holder ATV, and on the NBC network in the United States nine days later.  The last episode was shown on 20 April 1957 in the UK and 16 September 1957 on NBC. It later transferred networks in the US to ABC, who repeated the episodes from October 1957 to September 1958.

Episodes
Air dates are for ATV London; ITV regions varied date and order.

Home release
The complete series of 30 episodes was released as a DVD boxed set in the UK by Network DVD in 2004. Of the 14 episodes made in colour, only 12 are presented in colour for financial reasons. The other two colour episodes ('The Ugly Duckling' and 'The Missing Princess') are taken from black and white prints. In the US, the series was released as a DVD boxed set on 19 August 2008 by The Timeless Media Group with 14 episodes presented in colour, taken from US public domain prints.

See also
List of early colour TV shows in the UK

References

Thompson, Raymond H. (1991) "Television Series". In Lacy, Norris J. (Ed.), The New Arthurian Encyclopedia, pp. 445–446. New York: Garland. .
Vahimagi, Tise (1994). British Television: An Illustrated Guide. Oxford. Oxford University Press / British Film Institute. .

External links

Episode guide at The Historical Adventure Series Guide website.

1950s British drama television series
1956 British television series debuts
Television series based on Arthurian legend
Television series by ITC Entertainment
ITV television dramas
NBC original programming
1957 British television series endings
British adventure television series
Black-and-white British television shows
English-language television shows